The National Association Of Latino Independent Producers (NALIP) is a non-profit advocacy organization that promotes the visibility of Latino creators and producers in various media and their projects. The organization was formed in 1999 in New York, and is now headquartered in Los Angeles, CA.

History
NALIP was formed in 1999 by a group of activists and academics in New York. The founding members later moved the organization to Los Angeles to be closer to Latino groups and Hollywood executives. NALIP's early mission was to lobby Hollywood executives to advocate for increased representation of Latino creators and producers. 

In 2021, NALIP organized a theater buyout in an attempt to boost the success of the theatrical release of Lin-Manuel Miranda musical film, In The Heights.

Programs

NALIP produces The Latino Media Fest, an annual conference for U.S. based content creators and filmmakers. The event takes place in the Century City neighborhood of Los Angeles.

In 2021, NALIP launched "Latino Lens", an incubator for Latino producers in partnership with Disney, Starz, Amblin Partners, and the Motion Picture Association (MPA).

References

External links
 https://www.nalip.org

Hispanic and Latino American organizations
Arts organizations based in California
Organizations established in 1999